Horatio Churchill (28 February 1759 – 22 September 1817), of Lower Grosvenor Street, Middlesex, was an English politician.

He was a younger son of Charles Churchill, MP.

He joined the Army as an ensign in 1773 and rose to the rank of Major-General in the Royal Artillery in 1811.

In parallel with his military career he was also a Member of Parliament (MP) of the Parliament of England for Castle Rising from 1796 to 1802.

He married Harriot Ann Modigham (or Modigliani) and had a son and two daughters.

References

1759 births
1817 deaths
People from Mayfair
Royal Artillery officers
Members of the Parliament of Great Britain for English constituencies
British MPs 1796–1800
Members of the Parliament of the United Kingdom for English constituencies
UK MPs 1801–1802
British Army major generals
British Army personnel of the Napoleonic Wars
Military personnel from London